Deh Bala (also Romanized as Deh Bālā and Deh-e Bālā) is a village in Gowdin Rural District, in the Central District of Kangavar County, Kermanshah Province, Iran. At the 2006 census, its population was 65, in 13 families.

References 

Populated places in Kangavar County